Ricardo Santos (born 7 September 1982) is a Portuguese professional golfer who plays on the Challenge Tour. He won the 2012 Madeira Islands Open.

Professional career
Santos turned professional in 2006. From 2007 to 2011 he played regularly on the Challenge Tour. In 2007, he was given an invite to the Madeira Islands Open on the European Tour, and led after the first round. He began the 2011 season well, making nine of his first ten cuts, including seven top-15 finishes. He then recorded his first Challenge Tour victory at The Princess, which took him to the top of the tour rankings. He was the first Portuguese-born golfer to win at this level, as José-Filipe Lima and Daniel Silva, despite representing Portugal, were born in France and South Africa respectively. He eventually finished 2011 in fourth place in the Order of Merit to gain a place on the European Tour in 2012.

In 2012 Santos won on the European Tour for the first time, on home soil at the Madeira Islands Open. He was named the European Tour's 2012 Sir Henry Cotton Rookie of the Year, finishing 90th in the Order of Merit. He had a good start to 2013 with five top-10 finishes between January and May. Despite a disappointing end to the season he finished 65th in the Order of Merit. 2014 was less successful and Santos finished 116th in the Order of Merit. In 2015 he split his time between the European Tour and the Challenge Tour.

Since 2015 Santos has played on the Challenge Tour. He was joint runner-up in the 2017 Hauts de France Golf Open. In 2019 Santos was runner-up in the D+D Real Czech Challenge and then won the next event, the Swiss Challenge, his first win on the tour since 2012.

Professional wins (6)

European Tour wins (1)

1Dual-ranking event with the Challenge Tour

Challenge Tour wins (3)

1Dual-ranking event with the European Tour

PGA EuroPro Tour wins (1)

Other wins (2)
2010 Pestana Sives IGT Challenge
2011 Pestana Alto TGC Championships

Team appearances
Amateur
Eisenhower Trophy (representing Portugal): 2004
St Andrews Trophy (representing the Continent of Europe): 2004
European Amateur Team Championship (representing Portugal): 2003, 2005

Professional
World Cup (representing Portugal): 2008, 2011, 2013
European Championships (representing Portugal): 2018

See also
2011 Challenge Tour graduates
2019 Challenge Tour graduates
2022 European Tour Qualifying School graduates

References

External links

Portuguese male golfers
European Tour golfers
Sportspeople from Faro District
People from Faro, Portugal
1982 births
Living people